3/2  may refer to:

 March 2 (month-day date notation)
 3 February (day-month date notation)
The fraction for one and one half ( = ), or in decimal form 1.5

Just perfect fifth
3rd Battalion 2nd Marines
A triple metre time signature
A common aspect ratio (image)
Hemiola